The Croppies' Acre, officially the Croppies Acre Memorial Park, is a public park in Dublin, Ireland. It contains a memorial to the dead of the 1798 Rebellion.

History

The site, located on the north bank of the River Liffey to the south of Collins Barracks (formerly the Royal Barracks) is traditionally believed to have been used as a mass grave for Irish rebel casualties of the 1798 Rebellion; they were known as Croppies due to their short-cropped hair. It was also called Croppies' Hole at the time. Some rebels' bodies were also exhibited at the Croppies' Hole, tied to pikes.

The National Graves Association maintains that it was also used after 1798 to bury veterans of the conflict, including Matthew Tone, brother of Wolfe Tone. Bartholomew Teeling was also supposedly buried at Croppies' Acre after being hanged at Provost Prison, Arbour Hill. However, archaeological investigations have failed to find any human remains and its status as a grave is uncertain. The precise site of the burials was long disputed, all being known was that the dead had been buried on marshy ground near the Royal Barracks. Other reports mentioned that the corpses of the executed were thrown into the Liffey as a public deterrent; the river being tidal at this point. In addition, the River Liffey was realigned in this area to extend the city's quays. The supposed "Croppies' Acre" was for a long time a soldiers' playing field.

The Memorial Park was designed and laid out in 1998.

It was closed in 2012 by the Office of Public Works due to anti-social behaviour, including drunkenness and the use of hard drugs. Ownership was transferred to Dublin City Council and the Croppies' Acre was reopened in 2016.

See also 

 List of monuments and memorials to the Irish Rebellion of 1798

References

Parks in Dublin (city)
Cemeteries in Dublin (city)
Irish Rebellion of 1798
Mass graves
Memorials to the Irish Rebellion of 1798